(Japan > Fukushima Prefecture > Iwaki District, Fukushima (1896) > Kusano Village)

 was a village located in Iwaki District, Fukushima Prefecture(later Iwaki District(石城郡). Currently the city of Iwaki, Fukushima Prefecture.

Timeline
October 1, 1954 – Merged into the city of Taira.

See also
List of dissolved municipalities of Japan

Kusano Village